The SOM Institute is a survey research organisation at the University of Gothenburg. It was started in 1986.

References

External links
 SOM website

Polling
Public opinion research companies